The following is a list of episodes of the South Korean reality-variety show 2 Days & 1 Night, a segment of Happy Sunday, broadcast on the KBS2 every Sunday at 6:25pm KST. The show began airing in HD on May 23, 2010. Episodes are aired with English subtitles not only in episode reruns, but also episodes uploaded on KBS World's official YouTube channel.

There were 232 episodes aired during Season 1, which ended on February 25, 2012. Season 2 began airing on March 4, 2012, ended on December 15, 2013, and had 89 episodes. Season 3 began airing on December 22, 2013, ended on March 10, 2019 and had 257 episodes. Season 4 began airing on December 8, 2019 and currently has aired 162 episodes.

Note: The episode numbers indicated below are reckoned from when this segment was revamped as 2 Days & 1 Night, and do not take the first 12 episodes of its predecessor, Are You Ready, into consideration.

Season 1

2007

2008

{| class="wikitable"
!  style="text-align:left; background:#5599df; color:#fff; width:100px;"|Trip #
!  style="text-align:left; background:#5599df; color:#fff; width:100px;"|Episode #
!  style="text-align:left; background:#5599df; color:#fff; width:100px;"|Happy Sunday episode #
!  style="text-align:left; background:#5599df; color:#fff; width:150px;"|Date aired
!  style="text-align:left; background:#5599df; color:#fff; width:350px;"|Place visited
!  style="text-align:left; background:#5599df; color:#fff; width:600px;"|Comments
|-
| style="text-align:center;"| 11
| style="text-align:center;"| 24–25
| style="text-align:center;"| 166–167
|align="left"| January 13, 2008January 20, 2008
|align="left"| Jukbyeon, Uljin, Gyeongsangbuk-do
|align="left"|
Experience crab fishing
|-
| style="text-align:center;"| 12
| style="text-align:center;"| 26–28
| style="text-align:center;"| 168–170
|align="left"| January 27, 2008February 3, 2008February 10, 2008
|align="left"| Dongbaek Village, Yeonggwang, Jeollanam-do
|align="left"|
Visit and clean-up of the 2007 Korea oil spill
First 2 nights, 3 days filming
|-
| style="text-align:center;"| 13
| style="text-align:center;"| 29–30
| style="text-align:center;"| 171–172
|align="left"| February 17, 2008February 24, 2008
|align="left"| Sangsa Village, Gurye, Jeollanam-do
|align="left"|
Experience living in olden day homes
Visit to the town
Lee Soo-geun's baby announcement
|-
| style="text-align:center;"| 14
| style="text-align:center;"| 31–32
| style="text-align:center;"| 173–174
|align="left"| March 2, 2008March 9, 2008
|align="left"| Jejudo & Udo, Jeju-do
|align="left"|
3 members travel by plane while the other 3 take a 13-hour ship to get to Jejudo
Visit to Udo cut short due to bad weather
|-
| style="text-align:center;"| 15
| style="text-align:center;"| 33–34
| style="text-align:center;"| 175–176
|align="left"| March 16, 2008March 23, 2008
|align="left"| Nanjido, Han River, Mapo-gu, Seoul
|align="left"|
Shooting filmed after Lee Soo-geun's wedding
1st Freestyle Trip led by Eun Jiwon
Attend the dubbing session in KBS headquarters
|-
| style="text-align:center;"| 16
| style="text-align:center;"| 35–36
| style="text-align:center;"| 177–178
|align="left"| March 30, 2008April 6, 2008
|align="left"| Geochang, Gyeongsangnam-do
|align="left"|
Kim C was absent for the trip due to the death of his father
Experience in harvesting strawberries
Competed in KBS1's National Singing Contest
Special appearance of Song Hae
|-
| style="text-align:center;"| 17
| style="text-align:center;"| 37–38
| style="text-align:center;"| 179–180
|align="left"| April 13, 2008April 20, 2008
|align="left"| Yeoseodo, Wando, Jeollanam-do
|align="left"|
2 nights, 3 days filming
|-
| style="text-align:center;"| 18
| style="text-align:center;"| 39–40
| style="text-align:center;"| 181–182
|align="left"| April 27, 2008May 4, 2008
|align="left"| Donggang, Jeongseon, Gangwon-do
|align="left"|
Surprise visit for 8 students at a school in Donggang
|-
| style="text-align:center;"| 19
| style="text-align:center;"| 41–42
| style="text-align:center;"| 183–184
|align="left"| May 11, 2008May 18, 2008
|align="left"| Mungyeong, Gyeongsangbuk-do
|align="left"|
Visit and hold an impromptu guerrilla concert at Chungju National University
Live connection/broadcast of KBS-2TV Music Bank with MC Mong winning first place
Visit to the set of KBS drama series, King Sejong the Great
|-
| style="text-align:center;"| 20
| style="text-align:center;"| 43–44
| style="text-align:center;"| 185–186
|align="left"| May 25, 2008June 1, 2008
|align="left"| Suwon, Yeoju, Gapyeong County, Hanam, Ansan, Hwaseong, Paju & Uijeongbu, Gyeonggi-do
|align="left"|
Visit Yeoju's Silleuksa (Buddhist temple)
Visit the Han River along Gapyeong County
Visit Hanam's Namhansanseong ("South Han Mountain Fortress")
Visit Ansan's Daebu Island
Visit Paju's Hyeeri Town
Experiencing Uijeongbu's Budae jjigae ("army base stew")
|-
| style="text-align:center;"| 21
| style="text-align:center;"| 45–47
| style="text-align:center;"| 187–189
|align="left"| June 8, 2008June 15, 2008June 22, 2008
|align="left"| Daecheong Island, Baengnyeong Island, Ongjin County, Incheon
|align="left"|
2 nights, 3 days filming
First time using their camper van
Visit the Republic of Korea Marine Corps based on the island
MC Mong and his manager, Lee Heon-seok, catching a mullet fish in Daecheongdo
|-
| style="text-align:center;"| 22
| style="text-align:center;"| 48–50
| style="text-align:center;"| 190–192
|align="left"| June 29, 2008July 6, 2008July 13, 2008
|align="left"| Baekdusan, on the Korean Chinese border
|align="left"|
First international trip
4 nights, 5 days filming
Visit the birthplace of Korean poet, Yun Dong-ju
Held a guerrilla concert at Yongjeong Middle School
|-
| style="text-align:center;"| 23
| style="text-align:center;"| 51–52
| style="text-align:center;"| 193–194
|align="left"| July 20, 2008July 27, 2008
|align="left"| Jangsu County, Jeollabuk-do
|align="left"|
Family (of 4) trip concept
Live broadcast of Lee Seung-gi and Lee Soo-geun as guests on KBS2 FM Hong Jin-kyung's Radio
Hidden camera prank on the new PD
|-
| style="text-align:center;"| 24
| style="text-align:center;"| 53
| style="text-align:center;"| 194–195
|align="left"| July 27, 2008August 3, 2008
|align="left"| Inje, Gangwon-do
|align="left"|
Friendship trip concept
Visit Kangwon National University
|-
| style="text-align:center;"| —
| style="text-align:center;"| 54
| style="text-align:center;"| 196
|align="left"| August 17, 2008
|align="left"| Indoor gymnasium in Namyangju, Gyeonggi-do
|align="left"|
2008 Summer Olympics' Special
Special appearances by Lee Eun-kyung, Kim Dong-moon, Ahn Jae-hyung and Jiao Zhimin
|-
| style="text-align:center;"| 25
| style="text-align:center;"| 55–56
| style="text-align:center;"| 197–198
|align="left"| August 24, 2008August 31, 2008
|align="left"| Yeongdong, Chungcheong-do
|align="left"|
 2 Days & 1 Nights 1st anniversary
Memory trip concept
Kim Hye-yeon as a special guest for the live wake-up song
|-
| style="text-align:center;"| 26
| style="text-align:center;"| 56–57
| style="text-align:center;"| 198–199
|align="left"| August 31, 2008September 7, 2008
|align="left"| Salty Town, Sinan County, Jeollanam-do
|align="left"|
Salt farming
Experience working in "quicksand"/"muddy" area
|-
| style="text-align:center;"| 27
| style="text-align:center;"| 58–59
| style="text-align:center;"| 200–201
|align="left"| September 14, 2008September 21, 2008
|align="left"| Samsudong Gwinemi Town, Taebaek, Gangwon-do
|align="left"|
Experience harvesting napa cabbages
|-
| style="text-align:center;"| 28
| style="text-align:center;"| 60–61
| style="text-align:center;"| 202–203
|align="left"| September 28, 2008October 5, 2008
|align="left"| Busan
|align="left"|
Experience in "low-cost package" tours
Visit the Sajik Baseball Stadium
Lending a hand to help the baseball team
Experience selling jalgachi in the market
Experience catching Conger eels
|-
| style="text-align:center;"| 29
| style="text-align:center;"| 62–63
| style="text-align:center;"| 204–205
|align="left"| October 12, 2008October 19, 2008
|align="left"| Samcheok, Gangwon-do
|align="left"|
Visit the town
Experience living in a Neowa house
|-
| style="text-align:center;"| 30
| style="text-align:center;"| 64–65
| style="text-align:center;"| 206–207
|align="left"| October 26, 2008November 2, 2008
|align="left"| Chuncheon, Gangwon-do
|align="left"|
2nd Freestyle Trip (MT concept) led by MC Mong later replaced by Lee Seung-gi
Visit Namyangju's studio
|-
| style="text-align:center;"| 31
| style="text-align:center;"| 66–67
| style="text-align:center;"| 208–209
|align="left"| November 9, 2008November 16, 2008
|align="left"| Inje, Gangwon-do
|align="left"|
2nd Severe Winter Camp Training
|-
| style="text-align:center;"| 32
| style="text-align:center;"| 68
| style="text-align:center;"| 210
|align="left"| November 23, 2008
|align="left"| Yedang Reservoir, Yesan County, Chungcheongnam-do
|align="left"|
Ji Sang-ryul and Sang-don the dog (Sanggeun's son) as special guest
Fishing tour
Lee Soo-geun getting his driver's license for large vehicles (buses)
|-
| style="text-align:center;"| 33
| style="text-align:center;"| 69–70
| style="text-align:center;"| 211–212
|align="left"| November 30, 2008December 7, 2008
|align="left"| Nok Island & Oeyeon Island, Boryeong, Chungcheongnam-do
|align="left"|
Stopped at Nok Island because of bad weather
Leaving Lee Seung-gi on Nok Island
Touring Indeciduous forest
|-
| style="text-align:center;"| 34
| style="text-align:center;"| 71–72
| style="text-align:center;"| 213–214
|align="left"| December 14, 2008December 21, 2008
|align="left"| Haenam, Jeollanam-do
|align="left"|
Visit Yooseongwan's Daeheungsa (大興寺) (Buddhist temple)
|}

2009

 2010 

2011

2012

Season 2

2012

2013

Season 3

2013

2014

2015

2016

2017

2018

2019

 Season 4 

 2019 

 2020 

 2021 

 2022 

 2023 

Ratings
In the ratings below, the highest rating for the show will be in red, and the lowest rating for the show will be in blue each season.

Season 1Note: Ratings not found will be represented by "—".

Season 2Note:''' For the TNmS ratings, boxes marked with "—" means the episode did not make it into the Top 20, and therefore ratings were not found.

Season 3

 Season 4 

References

 External links 
  2 Days & 1 Night Season 3 on KBS World via YouTube2 Days & 1 Night Season 4'' on KBS World via YouTube

Lists of reality television series episodes
Lists of variety television series episodes
Lists of South Korean television series episodes